Clarence Darrow is a 1974 videotaped television production of a one-person play directed by John Rich, written by David W. Rintels and produced by Don Gregory and Mike Merrick. Henry Fonda portrayed the celebrated defense lawyer Clarence Darrow.

Cast
 Henry Fonda as Clarence Darrow
 John Houseman as himself

References

External links
 
 
 
 

1974 television films
1974 films
1974 television plays
1970s biographical drama films
1970s historical films
American historical films
American biographical drama films
Filmed stage productions
Films directed by John Rich
Films produced by Don Gregory
NBC Productions films
Clarence Darrow
Cultural depictions of Clarence Darrow
American drama television films
1970s American films